Brian O'Regan (born 14 February 1983 in Cork, Ireland) is an Irish Gaelic footballer. He plays for his local club Nemo Rangers and has been a member of the Cork senior inter-county team since 2008.

References

1983 births
Living people
Nemo Rangers Gaelic footballers
Cork inter-county Gaelic footballers